Necessary Roughness is the debut and so far only official studio album from the American hip-hop artist, The Lady of Rage. The album was released on June 24, 1997. Necessary Roughness was largely produced by Daz Dillinger, with contributions from Easy Mo Bee and DJ Premier. The album it peaked at #32 on the Billboard 200 on July 12, 1997. Necessary Roughness was the last Death Row Records album to be distributed by Interscope.

Track listing

Leftover track
"The Set Up" (featuring Heather B. & Nikki D) (produced by DJ Premier)
The song was confirmed as a diss song to rival Foxy Brown who previously made derogatory comments about Rage and Heather B. in a particular interview. The track however was subsequently deleted from the album's track listing. This would also be the second time Nikki D made a cameo in a Foxy Brown diss record, the first being Queen Latifah's controversial, "Name Callin' (Part 1)".

Charts

See also
1997 in music
List of albums

References

1997 debut albums
Albums produced by Daz Dillinger
Albums produced by DJ Premier
Albums produced by Easy Mo Bee
Albums produced by Soopafly
Death Row Records albums